Saint-Gabriel-Lalemant is a municipality in the Canadian province of Quebec, located in the Kamouraska Regional County Municipality. The municipality is named for St. Gabriel Lalemant, one of the Canadian Martyrs.

Municipal council
 Mayor: Raymond Chouinard
 Councillors: Alain Danjou, Jean-Yves Danjou, Michel Larose, Marc-André Lévesque, Denis Milliard, Jean-Paul Milliard

See also
 List of municipalities in Quebec

References

External links
 

Municipalities in Quebec
Incorporated places in Bas-Saint-Laurent